Carvalhal may refer to:
 Carvalhal (Abrantes), a civil parish in the municipality of Abrantes
 Carvalhal (Barcelos), a civil parish in the municipality of Barcelos
 Carvalhal (Mêda), a civil parish in the municipality of Mêda
 Carvalhal (grape), another name for the Portuguese wine grape Azal Branco
 Carlos Carvalhal (born 1965), Portuguese football coach